John Eamon Gay (born 7 November 1996) is a Canadian track and field athlete who specializes in the 3000 metres steeplechase. He competed in the men's 3000 metres steeplechase at the 2019 World Athletics Championships held in Doha, Qatar. He did not qualify to compete in the final.

In 2017, he competed in the men's 3000 metres steeplechase at the Summer Universiade held in Taipei, Taiwan. He finished in 11th place.

In 2019, he competed in the senior men's race at the IAAF World Cross Country Championships held in Aarhus, Denmark. He finished in 102nd place.

In June 2021, at the 2021 Canadian Olympic Trials, he established his personal best on 3,000 m steeple with 8:20.68 at Complexe Sportif Claude-Robillard, Montréal. He competed in the men's 3000 metres steeplechase event at the 2020 Summer Olympics held in Tokyo, Japan.

Personal bests
Outdoor
1500 metres – 3:41.13 (Portland 2022)
Mile – 3:58.14 (Burnaby 2021)
3000 metres – 8:03.91 (Melbourne 2023)
2000 metres steeplechase – 5:34.29 (Victoria 2021)
3000 metres steeplechase – 8:16.99 (Tokyo 2021)
5000 metres – 13:29.82 (Birmingham 2022)
10,000 metres – 28:18.10 (Burnaby 2020)
Road
5K – 13:58 (Moncton 2022)
Indoor
3000 metres – 7:45.34 (New York 2022)
5000 metres – 13:46.45 (Boston 2022)

References

External links 
 
 

1996 births
Living people
Athletes (track and field) at the 2020 Summer Olympics
Canadian male cross country runners
Canadian male steeplechase runners
Competitors at the 2017 Summer Universiade
Olympic track and field athletes of Canada
World Athletics Championships athletes for Canada
Sportspeople from Kelowna
20th-century Canadian people
21st-century Canadian people